Mariela Salinas (born 12 February 1980) is a Venezuelan former professional tennis player.

Salinas made her debut for the Venezuela Fed Cup team as a 17-year old in 1997, appearing in three ties. Her highlight was a singles win over Peru's Silvana Vargas. She didn't feature again in the Fed Cup until 2002, when she played in four further ties for Venezuela.

At the 2002 Central American and Caribbean Games in San Salvador, Salinas partnered with Stephanie Schaer to win a bronze medal in the women's doubles competition.

ITF finals

Singles: 2 (0–2)

Doubles: 1 (1–0)

References

External links
 
 
 

1980 births
Living people
Venezuelan female tennis players
Competitors at the 2002 Central American and Caribbean Games
Central American and Caribbean Games bronze medalists for Venezuela
Central American and Caribbean Games medalists in tennis
20th-century Venezuelan women
21st-century Venezuelan women